On 21 July 1991, two commuter trains crashed just west of Newton railway station in Cambuslang, near Glasgow, Scotland. The junction had been remodelled in the month previous to the crash.

Accident
At 21.55, train 2P55, the 21:55 Newton-Glasgow Central Cathcart Circle service, a British Rail Class 303 unit driven by Reginald McEwan left the "down" platform at Newton.  Meanwhile, train 2J66, the 20:55 Balloch-Motherwell service, a Class 314 unit driven by David Scott was crossing from the fast West Coast Main Line tracks through a single-lead junction to enter the "up" platform.  The two trains collided head on at the junction, killing both drivers and two passengers and injuring 22. The Class 303 unit overrode the buffer unit of the Class 314 unit and the trains telescoped over one another. The leading coach of the Class 314 was completely destroyed (being cut up at the site) later replaced by a redundant Class 507 driving motor vehicle.

People who lived in the area near to the crash described hearing something that sounded "like an explosion" and soon 400 people had gathered at the crash site. One local ran to Newton to telephone the signaller on duty and had asked him to turn the overhead wires off as he had feared for the safety of everyone.

Factors 

A report into the accident was commissioned by British Rail, which started on 23 July 1991 and reported to the Health and Safety Executive, who published a report in November 1992. A separate fatal accident inquiry team, composed of the Sheriff's court of Glasgow, were taken to the crash site by train in February 1993. They rode in train from the low level platform at Glasgow Central to the crash site at Newton and they were then bussed to the signalling centre which controlled the points and lights at Newton at the time of the crash.

The accident was attributed to the Cathcart Circle train passing a signal at danger and causing a collision at the single-lead junction, as at Bellgrove in Glasgow just over a year earlier.  The junction's configuration was newly installed at a cost of £5 million and designed to be simpler than the double-lead junction that it replaced. This allowed faster running on the WCML following the East Coast electrification (through Carstairs) but was inherently less safe.  The configuration was unnecessarily constrained and was strongly criticised in the accident report and by contemporary commentators (Hall 1999).

Aftermath 
Following the accident the junction was closed, with a special timetable in place for several months while the layout was revised to provide double track from the platforms towards Kirkhill. Diversions included West Coast Main Line trains being diverted via the Rutherglen and Coatbridge Railway and Whifflet with electric trains hauled by diesel locomotives to Mossend Yard, East Coast Main Line trains terminating at Edinburgh Waverley, and Lanark and Motherwell trains being diverted along the North Clyde Line via the Whifflet link line immediately west of Coatbridge Sunnyside.

After the accident, the track that had been removed was replaced immediately and it remains there to this day.

See also 
 Original double junction
 Single-lead junction

References

Sources

 
  
  Railways Archive account and official accident report

Train collisions in Scotland
Railway accidents in 1991
1991 in Scotland
Transport in South Lanarkshire
History of South Lanarkshire
Disasters in Glasgow
Railway accidents involving a signal passed at danger
Accidents and incidents involving Strathclyde Partnership for Transport
July 1991 events in the United Kingdom
1991 disasters in the United Kingdom
Rail accidents caused by a driver's error
1990s in Glasgow
20th century in South Lanarkshire